Sandra Minnert (born 7 April 1973) is a former German football defender. She played for SC 07 Bad Neuenahr and the German national team.

Honours

FSV Frankfurt
Bundesliga:  Winner 1994–95, 1997–98
DFB-Pokal: Winner 1991–92, 1994–95, 1995–96
DFB-Hallenpokal for women: Winner 1995

1. FFC Frankfurt
Bundesliga:  Winner 2000–01, 2001–02, 2002–03
DFB-Pokal: Winner 2000–01, 2001–02, 2002–03
UEFA Women's Champions League: Winner 2001–02
DFB-Hallenpokal for women: Winner 2002

Washington Freedom
Women's United Soccer Association: Winner 2003

Germany

 FIFA Women's World Cup: Winner 2003, 2007, Runners-up 1995
 UEFA Women's Championship: Winner 1995, 1997, 2001, 2005
 Football at the Summer Olympics: Bronze medal 2000, 2004

Individual
FIFA Women's World Cup All Star Team: 2003
Silbernes Lorbeerblatt: Winner 1995, 1997, 2001, 2003, 2005, 2007

Coaching career
Minnert was named as the new head coach of her club SC 07 Bad Neuenahr on 6 April 2009.

References

External links
 

1973 births
Living people
People from Gedern
Sportspeople from Darmstadt (region)
German women's footballers
Germany women's international footballers
1995 FIFA Women's World Cup players
1999 FIFA Women's World Cup players
2003 FIFA Women's World Cup players
2007 FIFA Women's World Cup players
SC 07 Bad Neuenahr players
1. FFC Frankfurt players
FSV Frankfurt (women) players
Footballers at the 1996 Summer Olympics
Footballers at the 2000 Summer Olympics
Footballers at the 2004 Summer Olympics
Olympic bronze medalists for Germany
FIFA Women's World Cup-winning players
Washington Freedom players
German football managers
Expatriate women's soccer players in the United States
FIFA Century Club
Olympic medalists in football
Medalists at the 2004 Summer Olympics
Women's association football defenders
Medalists at the 2000 Summer Olympics
Olympic footballers of Germany
UEFA Women's Championship-winning players
Footballers from Hesse
Women's United Soccer Association players